National Route 386 is a national highway of Japan connecting Hita, Ōita and Chikushino, Fukuoka in Japan, with a total length of 46.6 km (28.96 mi).

References

National highways in Japan
Roads in Fukuoka Prefecture
Roads in Ōita Prefecture